Jimmy Nicolás Schmidt Vallejo (born 15 December 1981 in Montevideo) is a Uruguayan footballer who plays as a goalkeeper for Envigado in the Categoría Primera A. He is the youngest debutant goalkeeper in the history of Club Nacional de Football with 17 years.

Career
Schmidt, nicknamed "Bebote", emerged from Nacional youth system programme, made his unexpected debut aged 17 in 1999 in the First Division. Later in Nacional he had no chance in the first team, so in 2003 he went to Villa Española.

In mid-2003, he signed a new deal with Plaza Colonia where he was used as a first choice goalkeeper. In August 2004, he went on loan to Belgian side R.A.E.C. Mons. But in 2005, he returned to Plaza Colonia and later he was taken to Rampla Juniors by Gustavo Matosas.

In January 2006, he emigrated again to Europe, but now to play for Hércules CF. He signed a five-year contract, but soon after in mid-2006 he was condemned to rescind his contract.

In early 2007, he returned to his homeland to play for Central Español playing again in the Uruguayan Top Division.

During 2009, he played for Peruvian side Sport Ancash, where his team finished 15th in the aggregate table and was though, relegated to the Peruvian Segunda División.

On 23 January 2011, Schmidt signed a two-year contract with the Peruvian team Cobresol FBC.

In January 2012, he signed a new deal with Colombian side Envigado.

Honours
Nacional
Uruguayan Primera División (3): 2000, 2001, 2002

References

External links

Profile at BDFA

1981 births
Living people
Footballers from Montevideo
Uruguayan footballers
Uruguay under-20 international footballers
Association football goalkeepers
Uruguayan expatriate footballers
Uruguayan Primera División players
Segunda División players
Categoría Primera A players
Club Nacional de Football players
Plaza Colonia players
R.A.E.C. Mons players
Rampla Juniors players
Hércules CF players
Central Español players
Sport Áncash footballers
Cobresol FBC footballers
Envigado F.C. players
Expatriate footballers in Belgium
Expatriate footballers in Colombia
Expatriate footballers in Spain
Expatriate footballers in Peru
Uruguayan people of German descent